The 2006 Asian Touring Car Championship season was the second season of the ATCC under Super 2000/BTC rules. It consisted of twelve rounds run over five weekends (the first three weekends having two rounds and the last two having three) in four countries in southeast Asia.

Teams and drivers

Race Calendar and Winners

Championship Results

Asian Touring Car Championship Season